Athaqafia is a Moroccan public television culture channel. It is a part of the state-owned SNRT Group along with Al Aoula, Arryadia, Al Maghribia, Assadissa, Aflam TV, Tamazight TV and Laayoune TV. The channel was launched on 28 February 2006.

References

External links

 Arrabia at LyngSat Address

Television stations in Morocco
Société Nationale de Radiodiffusion et de Télévision
Television channels and stations established in 2006
2006 establishments in Morocco